A jadomycin is a natural product produced by  Streptomyces venezuelae ISP5230 (ATCC10712), the organism which is most well known for making the antibiotic chloramphenicol.  The name jadomycin is applied to a family of related angucyclines which are distinguished by the E ring (usually an oxoazolone ring), which is derived from an amino acid. The amino acid incorporation which forms the E-ring is a chemical reaction, rather than enzymatic,  an uncommon occurrence in biosynthesis. As such a number of  jadomycins incorporating different amino acids have been discovered. Jadomycin A was the first compound of this family to be isolated and constitutes the angucylic backbone with L-isoleucine incorporated into the E-ring. A related analog, jadomycin B, is modified by glycosylation with a 2,6-dideoxy sugar, L-digitoxose. Jadomycins have cytotoxic and antibacterial properties.

Biosynthesis 
The jadomycin biosynthetic gene cluster is well characterized. Jadomycin biosynthesis encompasses type II polyketide synthase (T2Pks) assembly to generate the angucycline component, and a dideoxy sugar pathway, to generate the sugar donor NDP-L-digitoxose. Studies have implicated JadG, an FAD-dependent oxygenase, in the ring cleavage required for incorporation of amino acids. JadS, the glycosyltransferase that transfers L-digitoxose, has been shown to be flexible with respect to the sugar donor.

Analogs based on E-ring modification 
Jadomycin analogs have been obtained through culture of S. venezuelae in the presence of a single amino acid. The diversity of jadomycins includes those incorporating naturally occurring amino acids, non-proteinogenic amino acids, and synthetic amino acids with handles enabling further chemical modification.

References

Antibiotics
Streptomyces
Anthraquinone glycosides